Willow Grove was an unincorporated community in Jackson County, West Virginia.

References 

Unincorporated communities in West Virginia
Unincorporated communities in Jackson County, West Virginia